Changshu Power Station or "Changshu-1 power station" is a large coal-fired power station in China.

See also 
 List of coal power stations

References

External links 

 Changshu-1 power station on Global Energy Monitor

Coal-fired power stations in China
Buildings and structures in Jiangsu
Changshu